Boisdale may refer to:
Boisdale, Victoria, Australia
Boisdale, Nova Scotia, Canada
Boisdale, South Uist, Scotland (See Lochboisdale)